NFL Cheerleader Playoffs is a television show that debuted in 2006 on the NFL Network.  The official channel of the National Football League premiered each episode on Saturdays at 3 p.m. Eastern Time (ET).

The competition was produced by IMG's television production division.  Matt Gallant was the host, and Ian Eagle, Chad Johnson, and Carrie Milbank are reporters.

The playoffs were taped between July 17 and July 21, 2006 at Six Flags New England in Agawam, Massachusetts.  Two-person teams of cheerleaders from 25 of the NFL's 32 teams participated in a four-event series of competitions.

The first two events test the cheerleaders' athletic abilities in events like the 100-yard dash, kayaking, tandem cycling, and the obstacle course.  The third event is a trivia challenge called "Know Your NFL".  The final competition is a one-minute dance routine, similar to what they normally perform on NFL sidelines.

There were six first-round episodes, five with four teams and one with five.  The top two teams from each show (based on the point system below) advanced to the second round.  Three winners moved to the third round, with the top two teams going head-to-head in the final.  Each member of the winning team of cheerleaders received $5,000 cash and a Nautilus exercise machine, made by Bowflex.

Point system

The total combined points will determine the standings.
* Episode 6 was the only show to have five competing teams.

Episodes
The following are the final standings for each episode.

First round
In this round, the top two teams (both in bold) advanced to the second round.
Episode 1 (aired September 14, 2006)
Tampa Bay Buccaneers, Denver Broncos, Jacksonville Jaguars, Dallas Cowboys
Episode 2 (aired September 21, 2006)
Atlanta Falcons, San Diego Chargers, Oakland Raiders, Seattle Seahawks
Episode 3 (aired September 28, 2006)
St. Louis Rams, Tennessee Titans, San Francisco 49ers, Miami Dolphins
Episode 4 (aired October 5, 2006)
Buffalo Bills, Minnesota Vikings, Philadelphia Eagles, Houston Texans
NOTES: The Bills won all four individual competitions with a perfect score of 300 points.  The Vikings and the Eagles tied for second; the Vikings advanced based on a higher individual judges' score in the dance competition.
Episode 5 (aired October 12, 2006)
Washington Redskins, Cincinnati Bengals, Indianapolis Colts, Carolina Panthers
NOTE: A Panthers cheerleader, identified only as Shannon, suffered a leg injury during the obstacle course and had to withdraw from competition, along with her teammate, Misty.
Episode 6 (aired October 21, 2006)
New Orleans Saints, Kansas City Chiefs, New England Patriots, Arizona Cardinals, Baltimore Ravens

Second round
In this round, the top team (in bold) advanced to the semi-finals.

Episode 7 (aired October 28, 2006)
St. Louis Rams, Buffalo Bills, Cincinnati Bengals, Kansas City Chiefs
Episode 8 (aired November 4, 2006)
San Diego Chargers, Denver Broncos, Minnesota Vikings, New Orleans Saints 
Episode 9 (aired November 11, 2006)
Atlanta Falcons, Washington Redskins, Tennessee Titans, Tampa Bay Buccaneers
NOTE: A Buccaneers cheerleader, identified only as Catherine, suffered a knee injury during the roller skating race and had to withdraw from competition, along with her teammate, Monica, prior to the dance event.

Semi-finals Round
In this round, the top two teams (in bold) advanced to the finals.

Episode 10 (aired November 18, 2006)
San Diego Chargers, Atlanta Falcons, St. Louis Rams
NOTE: Originally only two teams were to advance to the finals. The Falcons and the Rams both tied for second with 195 points. Both teams had identical judges' scores in the dance competition which was the tiebreaker, so all three teams advanced.

Final Round

Episode 11 (aired November 23, 2006)
In a rematch of episode 10, the San Diego Chargers team (Casie and Shantel) defeated the Atlanta Falcons and St. Louis Rams squads to win the overall championship.  This time, all the teams finished in a three-way tie, with 210 points.  The Chargers were declared the winners based on winning the dance competition.

This show aired at 6 p.m. ET, one hour before the start of pregame coverage of NFL Network's first Thursday Night Football game.

Did not participate
The following six NFL teams in 2006 did not have cheerleaders: Chicago Bears, Cleveland Browns, Detroit Lions, Green Bay Packers, New York Giants, and Pittsburgh Steelers.  The Jets do have cheerleaders, but the "New York Jets Flight Crew" did not become a full squad until 2007. The Detroit Lions Cheerleaders were not founded until 2016.

Schedule change
The premiere of episode 6, scheduled for October 19, was postponed as NFL Network added a fifth NFL Replay of the previous weekend, the Bears' victory over the Cardinals.  It aired the following Saturday.  It was assumed that the regular schedule would resume the next week; however, NFLN soon announced that the move to Saturday would be permanent.  NFLN aired a fifth run of NFL Replay on Thursday nights, either a fifth game or a rebroadcast of one of the previous four telecasts from Tuesday or Wednesday, until November 23, when live games took over the time slot.

Current status
The playoffs were not repeated in 2007, as NFL Network chose not to renew the contract with IMG.  The series also repeated on July 14, 2008 on the NFL Network.

Other notes
This program resembled other IMG multi-event shows like Superstars and Battle of the Gridiron Stars.  One significant difference is that the cheerleaders sometimes make comments in a confession room, similar to the one found on many reality TV shows.
The judges for the dance competition were Johnson, choreographer Cris Judd, and former NFL cheerleader and current actress/model Bonnie-Jill Laflin.  (On episodes 5 and 7, Milbank replaced Johnson as a judge because the Bengals, for which Johnson plays as a wide receiver, were competing.)
Most of the songs used for the dance routines were provided by Astralwerks, a major electronic music label.  Artists signed to Astralwerks include Fatboy Slim, Gorillaz and Basement Jaxx.  Other songs came from Virgin Records and Sony BMG.
In the second round, the "Know Your NFL" round resembled the Pyramid series of game shows.  The dances in the same round followed a 20-20-20 format; one member of the team danced alone for 20 seconds, then the other member danced alone for the next 20 seconds, then both danced together for the final segment.
In the final round, "Know Your NFL" was based on another classic game show, Concentration.  The final dance to which all the teams competed was to the tune of "19-2000" by Gorillaz.  That song was also the theme song of the entire series.

See also
 National Football League Cheerleading

External links
 

Cheerleader Playoffs
2006 American television series debuts
2006 American television series endings
Cheerleading television series